G.G. Khadse (Also known as Khadse college) is a college in Muktainagar, India. It is affiliated to the North Maharashtra University of Jalgaon. It offers courses in science and arts for UG and PG.

History and formation 
Khadse college is run by 'Muktainagar taluka education society' organization It was established on 13 July 1990. It is located near Bhusawal road in Muktainagar town. It is re-accredited by the NAAC (National Assessment and Accreditation Council) with a 'B+' grade. It is named after Godavari Bai Khadse, mother of former revenue minister of Maharashtra Eknath Khadse.

Courses 
Khadse college offers coursework in Science and Arts fields. Master's degree coursework is also offered in science & arts fields.

Khadse college has a Yashwantrao Chavan Maharashtra Open University study centre for distant education.

Facilities 
Khadse has 27 classrooms, including a library stacking room with separate reading rooms for boys, girls and teachers. Khadse college also has a hostel facility for ladies which has 32 rooms. It also has an indoor sports hall, a swimming pool, and a helipad, swimming pool have area of 1000 square meters.

References

External links

Colleges in India
Jalgaon district 
Jalgaon
Maharashtra